Percy is a village and former commune in the Manche department in Normandy in north-western France. On 1 January 2016, it was merged into the new commune of Percy-en-Normandie.

Heraldry

See also
Communes of the Manche department

References 

Former communes of Manche